is a video game developed by Millennium Kitchen and published by Sony Computer Entertainment for the PlayStation 3. It is part of the popular Boku no Natsuyasumi series and was released in Japan on July 5, 2007.

Gameplay 
The game involves a boy's summer vacation on his aunt and uncle's farm in the wide-open countryside of Hokkaidō. Features from previous series entries, like catching a large variety of insects, a popular pastime in Japan, and swimming return, along with new activities, such as grass sledding, cow milking, and Chinese jump rope.

External links 
 Official Website (SCE) 
 Review (Crunk Games)
 IGN page
 Series of English diary entries explaining the game in detail (Hardcore Gaming 101)

Single-player video games
Adventure games
Japan-exclusive video games
Sony Interactive Entertainment games
2007 video games
PlayStation 3 games
PlayStation 3-only games
Video games about insects
Video games developed in Japan
Video games about children
Video game sequels
Video games set in 1975
Video games set in Japan
Works about vacationing
Millennium Kitchen games